Okulinka is a small river of Poland, a left tributary of the Narewka at Podlewkowie.

Rivers of Poland
Rivers of Podlaskie Voivodeship